Heraclides, son of Argaeus was an admiral sent by Alexander, shortly before his death, to construct ships on the Caspian Sea, with a view to a voyage of discovery, similar to that of Nearchus. Whether the task was ever undertaken or completed is not known.       Patrocles a general of Seleucus I is reported to have undertaken an exploration on the Caspian Sea.

References
Who's Who in the Age of Alexander the Great by Waldemar Heckel 

Ancient Macedonian admirals
Admirals of Alexander the Great